The Texas Regulators were an indoor football team that played in the American Professional Football League in 2007 and 2008.   

In 2007, they joined the APFL and were to play as the "Fort Worth Regulators". However, arena problems forced them to cancel all home games. The only away games they played were league games against Conroe Storm and an exhibition game against Beaumont Drillers. In the 2008 season, they appeared to have started again, but failed to play out the season. The APFL as a league had started to fall apart, and the NIFL had shut down operations as a league.

History
The Regulators were also the Fort Worth Sixers of the NIFL. They played in the schedule slot of the Sixers (the NIFL was in its final season as a league at the time) who were also scheduled to play home games at the Cowtown Coliseum in the Fort Worth Stockyards. The NIFL put a deposit down to hold dates and were to follow up with the playing surface for a home game but the league was falling apart and they could not send a turf field. This left the team with no home dates. The Regulators were part of both the APFL and NIFL in 2007 and played both Beaumont and Conroe. Beaumont was a member of the NIFL and played the Regulators twice, defeating them both times. The Regulators played Conroe as a league game because no APFL team scheduled for the date could make the travel.

The 2007 season found the APFL as a league in turmoil as the Regulators played both Conroe and Beaumont on consecutive days Saturday in Conroe and a Sunday afternoon game with Beaumont, also members at the time of the APFL and NIFL on back to back dates.

The Regulators' final game was held in the American Airlines Center in Dallas, where they faced Beaumont. The APFL decided after that game the Regulators would not finish the season schedule over a dispute over the game officials used. The APFL Commissioner wanted officials he sent to be used for a home game even though the Regulators were supposed to be able to use officials they chose. The league denied the Regulators remaining games be played. 

This shutdown also affected both Conroe and Beaumont as they were the only other Texas teams in the league. Both suffered as they lost out on games and essentially shut down. The season ended with Beaumont putting half a team together to play for the APFL championship and folding afterwards. Conroe did the same. Defensive backs coach Larry Hendrix of the Regulators/Sixers went on to become the head coach of the CIF expansion team Mesquite Bandits and player Personnel Director Roderic Boatman also on the staff went on to become the Offensive Coordinator of the Mesquite Bandits. Will Williams owner of the Regulators was also involved with the first arena team to play in Fort Worth the Fort Worth Calvary of the Arena Football League Williams hosted and produced the weekly pre game televised show Fort Worth Calvary weekly, the Calvary left Fort Worth relocating to Tampa Bay Florida and becoming the Tampa Bay Bandits.

The Regulators were an outdoor football organization before entering the indoor game. They were 8–2 and 7–3 in the final two outdoor seasons involved in semi-pro football. They no longer operate in semi-pro minor league football.

References

American Professional Football League teams
American football teams in the Dallas–Fort Worth metroplex